A folding chair is a type of folding furniture, a light, portable chair that folds flat or to a smaller size, and can be stored in a stack, in a row, or on a cart.

It can be combined with a folding table.

Uses
Folding chairs are generally used for seating in areas where permanent seating is not possible or practical. This includes outdoor and indoor events such as funerals, college graduations, religious services, and sporting events and competitions.

Folding chairs are also used in the home for any situation requiring extra seating. This includes parties, card games, and temporary seating at the dinner table.

Some folding chairs are rocking chairs as well.

History

Folding chairs or stools were used as seating in the Mediterranean area in the 15th-13th century BC. The chairs were also used as grave goods in the richest graves. A folding chair of ebony and ivory with gold fittings was found in Tutankhamun's tomb in Egypt.  

Folding chairs were already used in the Nordic Bronze Age, Ancient Egypt, Minoan Greece and Ancient Rome. The frame was mostly made of wood, and seldom made of metal.  The wood was inlaid with artistic carvings, gilded, and decorated with ivory. 
In Northern Europe, the remains of more than 18 folding chairs are known dating back to the Nordic Bronze Age such as the Daensen folding chair and the Guldhøj chair, found near Vamdrup, Denmark.

The folding chair became especially widespread during the Middle Ages. It was treasured as a liturgical furniture piece. Since the 15th and 16th centuries the folding chair has mostly had arm and head rests. Of course, newer chairs which are often found at functions and events are also called folding chairs. They are portable and easy to use.

In the United States, an early patent for a folding chair was by John Cram in 1855. In 1947, Fredric Arnold created the first aluminum folding chair with fabric strapping for the seat and back.  By 1957, the Fredric Arnold Company of Brooklyn, New York, was manufacturing more than 14,000 chairs per day.  Today, the folding chair is mostly made of hard plastic or metal or wood. Folding chairs can be divided into different categories.

Specifically modified and lighter folding chairs are used as weapons in professional wrestling. The investigation into Chris Benoit's death cited chronic traumatic encephalopathy, which is often caused by chair shots to the head and other related concussions as a leading cause of his symptoms. Chair shots to the head are now banned in the WWE and All Elite Wrestling, and their use of chairs was toned down to prevent related injuries. It was temporarily brought back at the Blood and Guts event in 2021.

Design

Lawn chair 
A common form of folding chair is often referred to as a lawn chair. It typically consists of a collapsible frame with a fabric covering. They are often used outdoors at sporting events and parks.

Leg pivoting
Folding chair legs can pivot to fold either under the seat, or at the seat.

Most folding chairs pivot at the seat level. The seat aligns between the back supports. The back support and the front legs are the same part. There are, however, several designs that fold under the seat. Side-X stools consist of two X-shaped pieces with a sheet of cloth between them that becomes the seat. Front-X chairs are similar to side-X stools, but have the addition of a backrest. Side-X chairs are unique because the support for the backrest and front foot is the same part. The seat is collapsed to align between the sidebars, either down between the front legs, or up to align between back-sidebars. Mechanisms vary, but the supports for the back and the front feet are invariably the same part.

Pricing

Prices and quality can be roughly divided into four categories, and are largely the same as for stacking chairs:

Low range 

This light and inexpensive furniture is usually made from steel tubing, with a plastic seat and backrest. This style is very common in homes, churches, schools, and community events.

Mid-range 
These are sturdy and a greater variety in styles and materials. They are typically not upholstered. They cost from approximately $25 apiece (2008). Their primary use is seating for large arenas, outdoor or places of worship, but also cafes and brasseries.

Upper range 
These folding chairs are often multiple reinforced, and come with padded seats and backrest. These are mainly sold for sporting events. The seat is sometimes made to fall backward so that it stands upright, making rainwater run off the upholstered seat.

High end 
Folding chairs in this category are rare and sold in a very small volume. They cost from $150 to $300 apiece. They may be upholstered, and are often priced higher because they are associated with a renowned manufacturer.

See also

 Curule seat
 Deck chair
 Director's chair
 Folding seat
 Glastonbury chair
 Jump seat
 List of chairs
 X-chair

References

Best Folding Chairs 2023